The Good Maharaja is an upcoming Indo-Polish war epic film directed by Vikash Verma, and produced by G7 Films Poland. The film stars Sanjay Dutt in the titular role of Digvijaysinhji Ranjitsinhji Jadeja, the Maharaja Jam Sahib of Nawanagar (now Jamnagar, Gujarat, India). The film also features Dhruv Verma in lead role, while Deepraj Rana, Gulshan Grover and Sharad Kapoor in supporting roles.

Principal photography began on 21 February 2020, with the scenes of the film being shot in 3 languages: Hindi, English and Polish.

Casts
 Sanjay Dutt as Maharaja Digvijaysinhji Ranjitsinhji Jadeja
 Dhruv Verma as a soldier and sniper
 Deepraj Rana
 Gulshan Grover
 Sharad Kapoor

Production
Principal photography began on 21 February 2020, with the scenes of the film being shot in 3 languages: Hindi, English and Polish. The shooting of the film was interrupted due to COVID-19 pandemic. The film is set during the time of World War II. The film will be shot in London, Russia, Poland and India.

Shiamak Davar has served as the choreographer, while film's music and background score has been composed by Hariharan.

Controversy
The Good Maharaja is based on Digvijaysinhji Ranjitsinhji Jadeja, the Maharaja Jam Sahib of Nawanagar, Gujarat, who, in the pre-Independence era, provided refuge and education to around 1,000 Polish children evacuated from the Union of soviet socialist republics (USSR) to escape German bombings during World War II.
 
The film was originally supposed to be made by Omung Kumar of Legend Studios. After the release of the first look, the daughters of Maharaja Digvijaysinhji Ranjitsinhji sent a cease and desist notice to the makers, Omung Kumar and Sandeep Singh; co-owners of Legend Studios. The legal representative of the daughters claimed, "The Maharaja was a public figure and if the facts are distorted, it will tarnish his image. Hence our clients have objection to the film, as no permission is sought from them." Sandeep Singh argued that no permission needed from the heirs of the Maharaja, and went on that "this legal action against the film is only an attempt to seek publicity by the Maharaja's family". Singh said that the story of the Maharaja is in the public domain. After that, Vikash Verma took over the film as the director.

References

External links
 

 

Upcoming films
Upcoming Hindi-language films
Upcoming Indian films
Films shot in Poland
Films shot in Gujarat
Indian World War II films
Indian historical films
Indian epic films